National Reconstruction Front was a  Greek political party founded in 1950 by Panagiotis Kanellopoulos as a continuation to his National Unionist Party.

In the 1950 Greek legislative election the party collaborated with Alexandros Sakellariou and other Centrist politicians. It gained 5,27% and elected 7 MPs.

Liberal parties in Greece
1950 establishments in Greece
Defunct political parties in Greece